Shriek (Frances Louise Barrison) is a character appearing in American comic books published by Marvel Comics. She is usually depicted as an enemy of Spider-Man, and the lover of Cletus Kasady.

Naomie Harris portrayed the character in the live-action Sony's Spider-Man Universe film Venom: Let There Be Carnage (2021).

Publication history
Shriek first appeared in Spider-Man Unlimited #1 (May 1993) and was created by writer Tom DeFalco and artist Ron Lim.

Fictional character biography
Shriek is a dangerous and criminally insane villainess with the ability to manipulate sound. During the events of Maximum Carnage, she allied herself with Carnage and several other supervillains who went about New York on a killing spree.

Shriek's origins and real name were, at first, uncertain. She was named Sandra Deel in her earliest appearances, but named Frances Louise Barrison in later appearances. According to the Spider-Man Encyclopedia, she was born Frances Louise Barrison, but used Sandra Deel as an alias.

During her childhood, Frances was abused by her mother for being overweight, driving her to drugs and leading to her later fixation on becoming a mother herself. She became a drug dealer, which exposed her to situations that ultimately damaged her sanity; namely, being shot in the head by a police officer, and being put in Cloak's Darkforce Dimension, which awakened Shriek's latent mutant abilities.

Shriek debuted at the start of the "Maximum Carnage" crossover. During Carnage's violent escape from the Ravencroft mental institution, he came across Shriek, who was also incarcerated and wished to join him. He freed her, and the pair embarked on a killing spree. They attracted the company of several other homicidal supervillains (Demogoblin, Doppelganger, and Carrion), and formed a "family," with Carnage and Shriek as the "parents" and the others as their "sons". Shriek also used her mental powers to increase the chaos by causing a number of New Yorkers to violently turn on one another, although the heroes were able to calm the people down before they did anything too serious, such as killing their own children. The killers fought a number of heroes, led by Spider-Man, but succumbed to in-fighting. Carnage slew the Doppelganger and left the others to their defeat and capture, although he was subsequently contained by the Avengers after a clash with Spider-Man, Venom and Black Cat.

In the aftermath, Shriek is returned to Ravencroft, but escapes her cell by short-circuiting her power dampening unit. Shriek frees fellow inmates Gale, Webber, Pyromania, and Mayhem, and together they try to break out of the facility, opposed by Spider-Man and John Jameson. While distracted by Spider-Man, Shriek is knocked out with a tranquilizer gun by Jameson.

When Dr. Ashley Kafka brings Malcolm McBride near Shriek's cell, Shriek recognizes Malcolm as her "son" Carrion, breaks out of her room, and escapes from Ravencroft with Malcolm. Agitated by Malcolm's refusal to acknowledge her as his mother, Shriek becomes violent towards him, and uses her powers to turn him back into Carrion after an encounter with Spider-Man, who Shriek plans on making her new "husband" after sensing a growing darkness within him. In an attempt to make Carrion fully embrace her as his mother, Shriek takes him to Beatrice McBride, the biological mother of Malcolm, with the intent of having Carrion murder the woman. The duo are tracked by Spider-Man, and in the ensuing brawl, Shriek abandons her plans to convert Spider-Man to her side, and forces Carrion to choose between her and Beatrice. The distraught Carrion instead begins to commit suicide with his own powers, which Beatrice tries to stop, stating, "Do you think my life matters? Do you think I wouldn't sacrifice myself a thousand times over to save my child?" when Shriek tells her that she will be killed by contact with Carrion. Touched, Shriek absorbs the Carrion virus, incapacitating herself, and turning Carrion back into Malcolm.

Shriek is readmitted to Ravencroft, where the dormant Carrion virus (which she had been treating like an unborn child) is extracted from her by the Jackal. Later, Shriek is brought on as a juror in Judas Traveller's mock trial of Spider-Man in the basement of Ravencroft. Shriek and the other members of the jury deem Spider-Man guilty of ruining lives and creating supervillains, but before they can execute their sentence of death they are returned to their cells and have their memories altered by Traveller.

She appears in Brand New Day as one of the villains in the Bar With No Name. After Carnage is returned to Earth by Hall Industries, the company purchases Ravencroft with the intention of using Shriek (who had been responding well to the treatment being administered to her by Doctor Tanis Nieves) as a power source for the Carnage symbiote, which had been separated from Cletus Kasady. Shriek is brought to Hall Industries, where exposure to the Carnage symbiote, coupled with her witnessing guards beating Doppelganger (who had been attempting to rescue her) causes her to snap, and return to homicidal mania. After Cletus reunites with his symbiote, Shriek and Doppelganger aid him in causing chaos throughout New York City, with Shriek gaining additional powers from another symbiote (which gives her a third arm, and covers half of her face) that Carnage's had spawned. Growing fearful of Shriek, the symbiote leaves her in favor of Nieves, its initial host, to create Scorn, who forces Shriek to use her powers to weaken Carnage, allowing Spider-Man and Iron Man to defeat him. In the aftermath, Shriek is shown to be in a coma, Scorn having done some unspecified damage to her brain.

Shriek regains consciousness, and is recruited by Caroline le Fay to battle the Fearless Defenders as a member of the new Doom Maidens. After the Doom Maidens are disbanded, Shriek reunites with Carnage, and saves him from Deadpool in Tulsa, Oklahoma. The two killers flee pursued by Deadpool, who crashes their car with a combine harvester, severely injuring Shriek, and enraging Carnage. Carnage flings Deadpool away, and escapes to the base of the Mercury Team (who he kills) with the unconscious Shriek. Carnage, troubled by Deadpool making him question his nihilistic beliefs, then has Shriek help him break into a psychiatric hospital, where they try to force the patients and staff to answer Carnage's questions about being controlled by higher powers, a concept which disgusts Carnage. Deadpool, who has bonded to the Mercury Team's symbiotes, uses his new shapeshifting abilities to disorient Shriek, causing her to run off. After a skirmish with Carnage, Deadpool captures Shriek, uses his symbiotes to disguise her as himself, and tricks the already distraught Carnage into nearly killing her, causing Carnage (who believes his attacking Shriek was "foreshadowed" by the higher powers) to suffer a mental breakdown. Shriek is hospitalized, and Carnage willingly allows himself to be arrested.

Shriek recovered, and was hired onto the Sinister Sixteen by Boomerang and the Owl. After being manipulated and abandoned by Boomerang, Shriek and three other members of the Sinister Sixteen sought revenge on him in the Bar With No Name, only to be defeated by him, Beetle, Overdrive, and Speed Demon.

Shriek subsequently attacks a police station with Gibbon, Griffin, and Ruby Thursday. The quartet is subdued by Spider-Woman's apprentice Porcupine.

Detroit-based supervillain Nain Rouge afterward hires Shriek and a new Firebrand to be his enforcers, bringing them into conflict with the Great Lakes Avengers.

Shriek later appeared as a secret ally to Kraven the Hunter at the time he was leading the NYPD's SWAT Team into hunting the Dinosaur People living beneath New York City ever since they were created by Stegron. She made herself known where she used her sonic attack on Venom and then collapsed the ceiling on him much to Kraven the Hunter's annoyance. Shriek stated to Kraven that he can have the head of Eddie Brock after their mission. Venom catches up to Kraven the Hunter and fights him and Shriek. With help from Tana, Venom stated that the Dinosaur People weren't killing anybody and that they are only surviving underground. Kraven the Hunter and Shriek are arrested by the NYPD.

Shriek eventually reunites with Carnage and Doppelganger again and together formed a cult dedicated in worshiping Knull. They eventually return to Doverton and got the codexes – the symbiote remnants left on the bodies of previous hosts – from the citizens who were infected by Carnage.

Powers and abilities
Being a mutant and following exposure to Cloak's Dimension, Shriek has the ability to manipulate sound in a number of elaborate ways. She can harness it for destructive concussive force or use it to disorient and agitate her enemies. She can apparently hypersonically induce intense emotion in those around her (generating fear, hate, or despair). She also has moderate powers of levitation that she can use to make herself fly and possibly some low level of psionic ability.

She is able to sense the darkest side to a person's psyche so that she can use her powers to specifically manipulate that person's emotions. Her scarred left eye is also prone to glow whenever she uses her powers. Why only that eye glows is uncertain.

Reception
 In 2021, Screen Rant included Shriek in their "Spider-Man: 10 Best Female Villains" list.
 In 2022, CBR.com ranked Shriek and Carnage 6th in their "10 Most Violent Spider-Man Villains" list.

Other versions

Marvel Zombies
During the Secret Wars, in a world of zombified characters, a zombie Shriek worked with zombie Mystique deep in the Deadlands and was amongst the zombies who were attacked by Ulysses Bloodstone after Deadpool, who acted as a source of meat, was destroyed. Later, she attempted to recapture a child named "Shuttup" after she had been rescued and was with Mystique during the fight between Elsa Bloodstone and Ulysses. She is seemingly killed along with the rest of the zombie horde.

Spider-Man: Heroes & Villains
Shriek appears in Spider-Man: Heroes & Villains Collection.

In other media

Television
Shriek made minor appearances in Ultimate Spider-Man, voiced by Ashley Eckstein. Throughout her appearances, she is consistently defeated by Spider-Man, with two occasions seeing her being prevented from joining Doctor Octopus' Hydra-backed Sinister Six and being infected by the Carnage symbiote before being neutralized by the Anti-Venom symbiote.

Film
Frances Barrison appears in the live-action Sony's Spider-Man Universe film Venom: Let There Be Carnage (2021), portrayed by Naomie Harris. This version fell in love with Cletus Kasady in her youth while they were both at the St. Estes Home for Unwanted Children before she was taken to the Ravencroft Institute. On the way there, Barrison tried to use her sonic powers to escape but was shot by police officer Patrick Mulligan. While Mulligan believed that he had killed her, Barrison survived, but was left heavily scarred, blind in her left eye, and subsequently imprisoned within a reinforced glass cell. In the present, after Kasady becomes Carnage, he breaks Barrison out of Ravencroft, and together they go on a rampage through San Francisco before capturing Mulligan and Anne Weying to lure out Venom. As Kasady and Barrison attempt to get married in a cathedral, they are confronted by Venom, who tricks Barrison into attacking Kasady and Carnage with her powers. This demolishes the cathedral and kills Barrison, who is crushed by a falling bell.

Video games 
 Shriek appears as a boss in Spider-Man and Venom: Maximum Carnage.
 Shriek appears as a boss in the Wii, PlayStation 2, and PlayStation Portable versions of Spider-Man 3, voiced by Courtenay Taylor. This version's powers come from a symbiote and she is married to Michael Morbius, whom she unwittingly turned into a vampire. While looking for a way to cure Morbius, Shriek and her gang, the Waster Tribe, attempt to control New York's citizens through a magic obelisk. However, Spider-Man destroys the obelisk and weakens a fleeing Shriek. Spider-Man later tracks her down and brings Morbius to her so she can cure him. However, she instead brainwashes Morbius and forces him to attack Spider-Man. After Morbius is defeated, Shriek fights Spider-Man herself, but the hero overwhelms her using his black suit, which is immune to her powers. Defeated, Shriek cures Morbius of his vampirism, but is left severely weakened and falls into a coma. Spider-Man leaves the unconscious Shriek in Morbius and Curt Connors' care so they can help her.

See also
 Harley Quinn

References

External links
 Shriek at Comicvine
 Shriek at Marvel.com
 Shriek at Spiderfan.org
 

Fictional characters who can manipulate sound
Fictional African-American people
Fictional empaths
Spider-Man characters
Fictional serial killers
Characters created by Ron Lim
Characters created by Tom DeFalco
Comics characters introduced in 1993
Marvel Comics female supervillains
Marvel Comics mutants
Marvel Comics characters who have mental powers